Archibald James Crippin (1916–2008) was an Australian rugby league footballer who played in the 1930s. A New South Wales interstate and Australian international representative winger, he played his whole club career with the North Sydney Bears.

Early life and club career
Originally from Forbes, New South Wales, Crippin moved to Sydney where he attended St. Joseph's College, Hunters Hill for his last two years of school in 1934 & 35. He was a talented sportsman and in his senior year he played in the champions 1st XV, the 1st XI and was in the senior Athletics squad setting a new GPS record in the long jump at the GPS carnival. He was selected to Combined GPS representative sides in cricket, rugby union and athletics. He joined North Sydney Bears in 1936 and played three seasons with them. Such was his talent, he was selected for representative teams in his first year in first grade, although shoulder injuries had virtually ended his career in 1937. He missed the entire 1938 season with injury and made a brief return in 1939, before retiring.

Representative honours

Only one year out of school and aged 19, Crippin was selected in the Kangaroos side to play Great Britain in 1936. He played in all three Tests on the wing outside captain Dave Brown. He marked his arrival with a brilliant 60m try in the second Test but bad-luck struck in the dying stages of the third when an England kick-through bounced back over his head and into the arms of Barney Hudson who scored the series-winning try.

He was selected to play for the 1937-38 Kangaroos but a shoulder dislocation that would sideline a modern-day player for a matter of weeks forced him into early retirement. He is listed on the Australian Players Register as Kangaroo No. 204.

War service and later life
Crippin served in the 35th Battalion a militia unit, in New Guinea during World War II.

Living to the age of 92, Crippin held the mantle as Australia's oldest living Test player for many years prior to his death. He was honoured in 2006 to present the Australian team with their jumpers before the Anzac Test against New Zealand. He had sixteen great-grandchildren at the time of his death.

Sources
 Middleton, David Rugby League Yearbook
 Whiticker, Alan  & Hudson, Glen (2006) The Encyclopedia of Rugby League Players, Gavin Allen Publishing, Sydney

References

 Arch Crippin Obituary at Bears Den
 An Unassuming Hero, author Andrew Webster

1916 births
2008 deaths
People educated at St Joseph's College, Hunters Hill
Australian rugby league players
North Sydney Bears players
Australia national rugby league team players
Rugby league wingers
Rugby league players from Forbes, New South Wales